Jake-Liam Clarke-Salter (born 22 September 1997) is an English professional footballer who plays as a defender for EFL Championship club Queens Park Rangers. Whilst at Chelsea, he spent time on loan at Coventry City, Bristol Rovers, Sunderland, Vitesse and had two spells with Birmingham City. Internationally, he has represented England up to under-21 level.

Club career

Chelsea

Clarke-Salter first joined Chelsea in 2006 and spent the rest of his youth career there bar one season at Sutton United. He made his under-18 breakthrough at Chelsea in December 2013 whilst still sixteen years old. He became a key figure and the under-18 captain in Chelsea's youth surge after winning the FA Youth Cup twice and the UEFA Youth League. Clarke-Salter was included in Chelsea's pre-season tour of the US in 2015. However, he failed to make a single appearance in Chelsea's disappointing campaign.

On 5 March 2016, Clarke-Salter appeared on Chelsea's substitutes' bench in a 1–1 draw with Stoke City. On 2 April, he made his professional debut in Chelsea's 4–0 victory at Aston Villa, replacing Pedro in the 74th minute. After the match John Terry praised his performance and attitude, and hoped that Clarke-Salter went on to replace him one day.

2016–17 season: Loan to Bristol Rovers
On 31 August 2016, Clarke-Salter and teammate Charlie Colkett joined League One club Bristol Rovers on a season-long loan. Unlike Colkett, Clarke-Salter did not join up with Rovers immediately, but remained at Chelsea while recovering from an injury sustained on international duty.

Clarke-Salter made his debut on 28 September 2016, starting in a 1–0 defeat away to Sheffield United. On his second appearance, on 18 October, he cut the ball back to provide the assist for the second goal of Matt Taylor's hat-trick as Rovers came back from 3–1 down to draw 3–3 with Milton Keynes Dons. Four days later he scored his first goal for Rovers with an 87th-minute header to complete a 2–0 win over Oldham Athletic. Clarke-Salter dislocated his elbow and broke a bone in his forearm during the 5–1 loss to Charlton Athletic in November and was out for nearly four months. He made his return as an 89th-minute substitute against Southend United in March 2017, but did not start a match until 11 April, in a 1–0 victory over AFC Wimbledon, and finished the season with just 13 appearances.

2017–18 season: Return to Chelsea and loan to Sunderland
Following a loan spell at Notts county, Clarke-Salter returned to Chelsea and signed a new four-year deal in July 2017. He was given the number 35 jersey and made his first appearance of the 2017–18 season during Chelsea's 5–1 EFL Cup victory over Nottingham Forest.

On 8 January 2018, Clarke-Salter joined Championship club Sunderland on loan for the remainder of the campaign. Just under a week later, he made his debut during Sunderland's 4–0 away defeat against Cardiff City, playing the full 90 minutes. On 24 February 2018, Clarke-Salter was shown a red card for what BBC Sport reporter saw as a "nasty late challenge" on Middlesbrough's Adama Traoré in a match that ended as a 3–3 draw. In his first game back from suspension, Clarke-Salter was dismissed again after receiving a second yellow card in a 2–0 defeat against Preston North End. He finished the loan spell with nine appearances.

2018–19 season: Loan to Vitesse
On 2 July 2018, Clarke-Salter agreed to join Dutch side Vitesse on a season-long loan.

2019–20 season: Loan to Birmingham City
Clarke-Salter signed for Championship club Birmingham City on 24 July 2019 on loan for the season. He made his debut on 6 August in the EFL Cup first round visit to Portsmouth. Manager Pep Clotet fielded an inexperienced team, and Clarke-Salter played the whole of the 3–0 defeat. He did not play in the Championship until 1 October, taking the place of the injured Marc Roberts in the starting eleven for the 1–0 defeat away to Wigan Athletic. According to the manager, "he played with a lot of maturity, he was very focused, he dealt very well with the physicality of the game and worked very well with Harlee [Dean] as well. He also covered the line very well. I think on the ball he was very good as well so it was a very positive game for him." His performance was similarly positive in his next appearance a month later, when he replaced the suspended Dean for a 1–0 defeat at home to Fulham. He scored his first goal for Birmingham in a 1–1 draw with Millwall on 30 November.

2020–21 season: Loan return to Birmingham City
On 16 October 2020, Clarke-Salter returned to Birmingham City on loan for the remainder of the season. A calf injury kept him out until after the international break, and he made his debut on 24 November away to Luton Town as one of three centre-backs alongside Dean and Roberts. He was a regular in the matchday squad for the next three months, made nine starts, mainly as cover for injured or suspended players, and one substitute appearance. Apart from one poor game away to Cardiff City, he performed adequately, showing technical competence that his fellow defenders did not, but the Birmingham Mail suggested that overall he had wasted his season by spending it on Birmingham's bench.

2021-22 season: Loan to Coventry City
On 13 August 2021, Clarke-Salter joined Championship club Coventry City on a loan deal until the end of the season. Clarke-Salter was a mainstay in the Coventry team in a largely successful loan spell, making 29 appearances for the Sky Blues, with injury hampering him from making more. On June 10, 2022, Chelsea announced he was leaving the club.

Queens Park Rangers
On 17 June 2022, Clarke-Salter joined EFL Championship side Queens Park Rangers on a four-year deal.

International career
Clarke-Salter was selected for the England U20 in the 2017 FIFA U-20 World Cup. He played in four of the seven games, but in the final he conceded a controversial penalty that was saved by goalkeeper Freddie Woodman. England beat Venezuela 1–0, the first time an England team had won a global tournament since the 1966 World Cup.

Clarke-Salter made his England U21 debut on 24 March 2018 in a 2019 European Championship qualifier at home to Romania U21; he scored England's second goal in a 2–1 victory.

Clarke-Salter was named as captain of the England Under-21 side ahead of the European Championship finals.

Career statistics

Honours
Chelsea Reserves
FA Youth Cup: 2013–14, 2014–15, 2015–16
UEFA Youth League: 2014–15, 2015–16

England U20
FIFA U-20 World Cup: 2017

England U21
Toulon Tournament: 2018

References

External links
England profile at The Football Association

1997 births
Living people
Footballers from Carshalton
English footballers
England youth international footballers
England under-21 international footballers
Association football defenders
Chelsea F.C. players
Bristol Rovers F.C. players
Sunderland A.F.C. players
SBV Vitesse players
Birmingham City F.C. players
Coventry City F.C. players
Queens Park Rangers F.C. players
Premier League players
English Football League players
Eredivisie players
English expatriate footballers
English expatriate sportspeople in the Netherlands
Expatriate footballers in the Netherlands
Black British sportspeople